Milo of Minden (died c. 996) was the bishop of Minden from 969 to 996.

Life
Milo was appointed the bishop of Minden by Otto II., probably after being a canon in Cologne.

In 991 he took part in the campaign of Bernard I, Duke of Saxony against the Slavs.

References

Bishops of Minden
10th-century bishops